Per Tage Svensson (born 16 October 1931) is a former international speedway rider from Sweden.

Speedway career 
Svensson reached the final of the Speedway World Championship in the 1963 Individual Speedway World Championship.

World final appearances

Individual World Championship
 1963 –  London, Wembley Stadium – 15th – 1pt

World Team Cup
 1961 -  Wrocław, Olympic Stadium (with Sören Sjösten / Rune Sörmander / Björn Knutsson / Ove Fundin) - 2nd - 30pts (7)

References 

1931 births
Swedish speedway riders
Living people
Oxford Cheetahs riders